Stoislav I (German: Stoislaw I.) (died after 1193) may have been the progenitor of the aristocratic House of Putbus. According to the Pomeranian chronicler Thomas Kantzow, Stoislav was a son of Prince Ratislaus of Rügen (Ratze). Kantzow's assertion is not however provable, so that it is also questionable whether he was actually a brother of Princes Tetzlav and Jaromar I.

Literature
 Leopold von Zedlitz-Neukirch: Neues preussisches Adelslexicon. Vol. 4, Gebrüder Reichenbach, Leipzig, 1837, S. 65–66 (Digitalisat).
     
 
 Ursula Scheil: Zur Genealogie der einheimischen Fürsten von Rügen. Veröffentl. der Historischen Kommission für Pommern, Reihe V, Heft 1. Köln/Graz 1962

References 

Princes of Rügen
12th-century births
Year of death unknown